Dandupur is a village in the Chaka Mandal of Prayagraj District, India. At a distance of 10 kilometres from Prayagraj, the village almost finds itself in the main city. Very soon, this once village shall witness Municipal Corporation elections, thereby redefining the limits of the city of Allahabad and bringing the place within the limits of the main city.

History 
The name Dandupur is based on "Dandu" who was the elder son of a zamindar who is believed to be the forefather of the villagers. Dandupur belongs to the Shia Muslim Community and holds up a mix cultural fabric. It has old mosques and Imambaras that have great historic value. After independence and ending the zamindari system and issued the Privy Purse to the Zamindars and talukedars from the India Government, the zamindar Inamul Hussain was elected the first pradhan of Dandupur village. At present its counted as a developed village.

Economy
During the British period Dandupur used to be a rich village with most of the inhabitants owning large pieces of land.  However, this has changed after independence as owning lands or the feudal system was abolished. 
The following generation of the village excelled in the field of education and reached to high ranks in India and abroad thus uplifting the economic position of the village.  Nowadays as the economy of Allahabad has been improving with the influence of that economy of DANDUPUR has been flourishing. 
In the new master plan DANDUPUR will come under Allahabad city.

References 

Villages in Allahabad district